Maperton is a village and civil parish in Somerset, England, situated  south west of Wincanton in the South Somerset district.  The village has a population of 140. However, this small number includes Elliscombe House care home which alone has an average of 40 residents.

History

The name of the village means maple settlement and is pronounced Mayperton. This pronunciation is particularly used by newer residents but many older residents use the alternative pronunciation "map-er-ton".
In the Domesday Book of 1086 the manor is recorded as held by Turstin FitzRolf.
The manor was held by Francis Hastings of North Cadbury around 1600.

The parish was part of the hundred of Catsash.

Earthworks show the site of a village, with a village pond, and ridge and furrow agriculture from the Middle Ages south of Wyke Champflower.

Maperton House was built in the 19th century, but incorporates some 18th-century fragments from a previous manor house which stood on the same site. (Not to be confused with Mapperton House, seat of the Earls of Sandwich, near Beaminster in Dorset.)

Governance

Maperton is grouped with Holton and North Cheriton as the North Vale Group Parish. The parish council has responsibility for local issues, including setting an annual precept (local rate) to cover the council's operating costs and producing annual accounts for public scrutiny. The parish council evaluates local planning applications and works with the local police, district council officers, and neighbourhood watch groups on matters of crime, security, and traffic. The parish council's role also includes initiating projects for the maintenance and repair of parish facilities, as well as consulting with the district council on the maintenance, repair, and improvement of highways, drainage, footpaths, public transport, and street cleaning. Conservation matters (including trees and listed buildings) and environmental issues are also the responsibility of the council.

The village falls within the Blackmore Vale ward Non-metropolitan district of South Somerset, which was formed on 1 April 1974 under the Local Government Act 1972, having previously been part of Wincanton Rural District. The district council is responsible for local planning and building control, local roads, council housing, environmental health, markets and fairs, refuse collection and recycling, cemeteries and crematoria, leisure services, parks, and tourism.

Somerset County Council is responsible for running the largest and most expensive local services such as education, social services, libraries, main roads, public transport, policing and fire services, trading standards, waste disposal and strategic planning.

It is also part of the Somerton and Frome county constituency represented in the House of Commons of the Parliament of the United Kingdom. It elects one Member of Parliament (MP) by the first past the post system of election.

Religious sites

The Anglican parish Church of St Peter and St Paul has a tower dating from the late 15th century, with the remainder of the church being rebuilt in 1869 by Henry Hall. It has been designated as a Grade II listed building. It was a favourite venue for clandestine weddings in the early 18th century.

Due to deterioration of the red clay tile roof, the church has been placed on the Heritage at Risk Register.

References

External links

Villages in South Somerset
Civil parishes in Somerset